Sabbatini is an Italian family name.

Sabbatini or Sabatini may refer to:

 Andrea Sabbatini (1487-1530), Italian painter of the Renaissance, one of the best pupils of Raphael
 Lorenzo Sabbatini (c. 1530-1576), Italian renaissance painter
 Nicola Sabbatini (1574-1654), Italian architect and engineer who pioneered in theatrical lighting techniques
 Galeazzo Sabbatini (1597-1662), Italian musician and composer
 Pietro Paolo Sabbatini (c.1600-1658), Italian composer
 Ludovico Sabbatini (1650-1724), Italian priest and religious teacher
 Gaetano Sabatini (1703-1734), Italian painter
 Francesco Sabatini (1722-1797), Italian architect who worked in Spain
 Luigi Antonio Sabbatini (1732-1809), Italian composer
 Leopoldo Sabbatini (1860-1914), first rector of Bocconi University at Milano
 Rafael Sabatini (1875-1950), Italian/British author
 Amadeo Sabattini (1892-1960), reformist governor of Córdoba Province, Argentina
 Innocenzo Sabbatini (1891-1983), Italian architect
 Enrico Sabbatini (1932-1998), costume designer for the theater and cinema industry
 Renato M.E. Sabbatini (born 1947),  Brazilian scientist and writer
 Gabriella Sabbatini (1950-), Italian poet from Ancona
 Gaia Sabbatini (born 1999), Italian middle-distance runner 
 Giuseppe Sabbatini (1957-), leading Italian opera singer (tenor)
 Gabriela Sabatini (born 1970), Argentine tennis player
 Rory Sabbatini (born 1974), South African professional golfer

Places
 Sabatini, Italy, a volcanic region in Italy
 Sabatini Gardens, Madrid, Spain

See also
 Sabatini (disambiguation)